John Anderson (1748 in Ayrshire – May 4, 1832 in Invergarry) was a Scottish carpenter by trade. He was a close friend of Robert Burns and is reputed to have built his coffin in 1796. He is also the subject of a famous poem by Burns, later set to music called "John Anderson My Jo, John."

He is buried in Kilchuimen Burial Ground, Fort Augustus with a Scottish Heritage plaque. It mentions that his son in law was killed in the wreck of an early British passenger steamship, PS Comet II, near Gourock in 1825.

The heritage plaque reads:

"John Anderson. My Jo.
Friend of Robert Burns
Character of one of the most touching of Burns Songs. Gifted by the family of the late Norman Watters
Past President of Bowhill People's Burns Club"

The stone reads:

"Sacred to the memory of
John Anderson who died at Invergarry
the 4 May 1832 Aged 84 years
also his daughter Catherine who died at Invergarry the 20 December 1832 aged 52 years
Relict of the late
James Grierson who was lost in the "Comet" off Gourack Point the 20 Oct 1825
This stone is erected by their affectionate children."

Despite the claim recorded in the heritage plaque above,  Burns' poem is based on an earlier poem of the same title and metre:

John Anderson, my jo, John
I wonder what you mean
To lie sae lang in the morning
And sit sae late at e'en ...................

The earlier version was extant c.1744,  and is a mildly bawdy ballad in which the wife berates John for his waning performance in bed,  recalls his former ardour,  and threatens him with the cuckold's horns if he doesn't deliver:

........... But 'tis a mickle finer thing
To see your hurdies fyke
To see your hurdies fyke, John
And hit the rising blow
'Tis then I like your chanter pipe
John Anderson, my jo.

The editors of the Canongate Burns (2001) offer no explanation for Burns's adaptation of the old song of six stanzas into a two verse celebration of love into old age (Burns himself died at the age of 37).

References
 
The Canongate Burns (2 Vols);  Editors Andrew Noble & Patrick Scott Hogg; Edinburgh, 2001

External links

1759 births
1832 deaths
Scottish carpenters
People from Ayrshire
18th-century Scottish people
19th-century Scottish people
Robert Burns